John Hare may refer to:

John Hare (MP died 1613), English MP for Horsham (UK Parliament constituency)
Sir John Hare (MP died 1637) (1603–1637), English MP for Aylesbury 1625, Evesham 1626 and King's Lynn 1628
John Hare, 1st Viscount Blakenham (1911–1982), British Conservative MP and government minister
John Hare (actor) (1844–1921), British actor and theatre manager
John Hare (bishop) (1912–1976), Anglican Bishop of Bedford
John Hare (conservationist) (1934–2022), British explorer, author, and conservationist
John E. Hare (born 1949), British philosopher
John Hare, Jr., Canadian politician
 John Hare Powel (1786-1856), born John Powel Hare, American agriculturalist, politician, art collector, and philanthropist
Jack Hare (1920–2009), Canadian politician
Jon Hare (born 1966), British computer game designer
 John Bruno Hare (1955–2010), the founder of Internet Sacred Text Archive